Victor Söderström (born 17 January 1994) is a Swedish footballer who plays for Vasalund.

Career
Söderström began his career with Hammarby IF before moving to IF Brommapojkarna in 2005. He made his professional debut against Landskrona BoIS in October 2011 and he established himself in Roberth Björknesjö's squad as they gain promotion to the Allsvenskan in 2012. In July 2013 Söderström had a trial with English side Stoke City.

References

External links
 
 

1994 births
Living people
Swedish footballers
Association football forwards
IF Brommapojkarna players
IK Frej players
Assyriska FF players
Akropolis IF players
Dalkurd FF players
Vasalunds IF players
Superettan players
Allsvenskan players
Ettan Fotboll players
Sweden youth international footballers